Martim Lourenço da Cunha (1300-) was a Portuguese nobleman, 1st Lord  of Pombeiro, in the Kingdom of Portugal.

Biography 

His parents were Lourenço Martins da Cunha (grandson of Paio Guterres) and Maria de Louzão, daughter of Pedro de Oliveira and Elvira Anes Oliveira. Martim was married to Maria Gonçalves de Briteiros, daughter of Gonçalo Anes de Briteiros and Maria Afonso Chichorro, granddaughter of Afonso III of Portugal.

References 

1300 births
1360s deaths
14th-century Portuguese people
Portuguese nobility
Portuguese Roman Catholics